The 1990 Lehigh Engineers football team was an American football team that represented Lehigh University during the 1990 NCAA Division I-AA football season. Lehigh tied for second place in the newly renamed Patriot League. 

In their fifth year under head coach Hank Small, the Engineers compiled a 7–4 record. Craig Domalewski and Jarrod Johnson were the team captains.

The Engineers outscored opponents 329 to 211. Their 3–2 conference record placed Lehigh in a three-way tie for second place in the six-team Patriot League standings. This was the first year of competition under the Patriot League banner; the league had been known as the Colonial League since 1986.

Following two early-season wins, Lehigh briefly entered the national Division I-AA rankings, appearing at No. 20 in the poll released September 18. A loss dropped them out of the top 20 the next week. Lehigh finished the season unranked.

Lehigh played its home games at Goodman Stadium on the university's Goodman Campus in Bethlehem, Pennsylvania.

Schedule

References

Lehigh
Lehigh Mountain Hawks football seasons
Lehigh Engineers football